John Ludlow may refer to:

John de Ludlow, medieval Chancellor of the University of Oxford
 John Malcolm Forbes Ludlow, English lawyer and leader of the Christian socialist movement
 John Ludlow (MP) for Oxford in 1395
 John Ludlow (theologian) (1793–1857), a 19th-century clergyman, theologian, and professor at New Brunswick Theological Seminary and Rutgers College